For the professional rugby league football team see New York Freedom (rugby league).

The New York Freedom are a defunct American soccer club based in New York City.

Year-by-year

Freedom
Defunct Premier Development League teams
USL Second Division teams
Association football clubs established in 1999
Association football clubs disestablished in 2003
1999 establishments in New York City
2003 disestablishments in New York (state)